Emory Nicholas "Bubba" Church (September 12, 1924 – September 17, 2001) was an American professional baseball right-handed starting pitcher who played in Major League Baseball (MLB) for the Philadelphia Phillies (1950–52), Cincinnati Reds / Redlegs (1952–53), and Chicago Cubs (1953–55).

A native of Birmingham, Alabama, Church posted a 36–37 record, with 274 strikeouts, and a 3.37 earned run average (ERA), in  innings pitched, over the course of his six-season big league career.

Baseball career
During his rookie season, Church was playing a key role for the famed 1950 "Whiz Kids" Phillies in their fight for a pennant. He pitched a week later, but after the game his season was over, and he did not play in the 1950 World Series. He finished 1950 at 8–6 with an ERA of 2.73 and two shutouts in 142 innings.

Church enjoyed his most productive season in 1951, when he collected career-highs in victories (15), strikeouts (104), shutouts (4) and innings (246), including a one-hitter over the Pittsburgh Pirates. Early in the 1952 season, he was traded to the Reds. Church was 5–9 for Cincinnati, and 7–8 for the Reds and the Chicago Cubs in 1953. He pitched for the Cubs until his career ended in 1955.

Prior to Church's professional baseball career, he served in the United States Army Air Forces during World War II serving in the China Burma India Theater.

Death
On September 17, 2001, Church died at his home in Birmingham, Alabama, at the age of 77.

References

External links

Bubba Church at SABR (Baseball BioProject)
Bubba Church at Baseball Library
Historic Baseball

1924 births
2001 deaths
Baseball players from Birmingham, Alabama
Chicago Cubs players
Cincinnati Reds players
Los Angeles Angels (minor league) players
Louisiana State University alumni
LSU Tigers baseball players
Major League Baseball pitchers
Miami Marlins (IL) players
Mississippi State Bulldogs baseball players
Navegantes del Magallanes players
American expatriate baseball players in Venezuela
Philadelphia Phillies players
Salina Blue Jays players
United States Army Air Forces personnel of World War II